= CYP74 family =

Group of cytochrome P450 enzymes

Cytochrome P450, family 74, also known as CYP74, is a cytochrome P450 family in land plant supposed to derived from horizontal gene transfer of marine animal CYPs.
